Mogdumpur is a village in Karimnagar district, Telangana, India. It is approximately 10 kilometres east of Karimnagar city. 

Villages in Karimnagar district